Yordan Angelov (28 August 1953 – 5 May 2013) was a Bulgarian volleyball player who competed in the 1980 Summer Olympics.

In 1980 he was part of the Bulgarian team which won the silver medal in the Olympic tournament. He played five matches.

References

External links
Yordan Angelov's profile at Sports Reference.com
Yordan Angelov's obituary 

1953 births
2013 deaths
Bulgarian men's volleyball players
Olympic volleyball players of Bulgaria
Volleyball players at the 1980 Summer Olympics
Olympic silver medalists for Bulgaria
Olympic medalists in volleyball
Medalists at the 1980 Summer Olympics